The Chinese Temple of Dili is a temple used by the Chinese diaspora of Dili, East Timor. The temple was built in 1928, during the Portuguese control of East Timor, and is still in use today.

The main shrine of the temple is dedicated to Lord Guan, a historical Chinese general from the 3rd century, who is popularly worshipped in Chinese folk religion, Confucianism, and Chinese Buddhism. Another room is dedicated to Guan Yin, a bodhisattva venerated in Chinese folk religion.

History 
In 1926, the Chinese community who migrated from Macau set up a shrine in a garage where they worshipped a 30 cm high statue of Guan Gong that had been sent from China. In 1928, after getting funding from both the Portuguese government and the Chinese diaspora, they built the current temple and enshrined the statue inside the temple. The Guan Di temple was believed to have been built in 1936(7). A shrine dedicated to Guan Yin was built in 1977.

The temple survived the Japanese occupation during World War II and the Indonesian occupation without being vandalized.

References

East Timor
Religious buildings and structures completed in 1928
Buildings and structures in Dili
Buddhist temples in East Timor
20th-century Buddhist temples